Simona Galassi (born 27 June 1972) is an Italian former boxer. As a professional, she competed from 2006 to 2015 and was a world champion in two weight classes, having held the WBC female flyweight title from 2008 to 2011 and the IBF female junior-bantamweight title from 2011 to 2012. At regional level she held the European female flyweight title twice between 2007 and 2015. As an amateur, she won gold medals at the 2001, 2002 and 2005 World Championships, and the 2003, 2004 and 2005 European Championships.

Professional boxing record

References

External links
 

Living people
1972 births
Italian women boxers
People from Forlì
International Boxing Federation champions
World Boxing Council champions
European Boxing Union champions
AIBA Women's World Boxing Championships medalists
Flyweight boxers
Super-flyweight boxers
Southpaw boxers
World flyweight boxing champions
World super-flyweight boxing champions
Sportspeople from the Province of Forlì-Cesena